Hippopotamus is a French chain of grill restaurants  with a hippopotamus as its logo. The brand is owned by Groupe FLO.  It is open daily from 11:00am to 1:00am. As of November 2013, Hippopotamus has 170 locations worldwide,  including in Ivory Coast, Morocco, Algeria, Portugal, United Arab Emirates, Russia, Thailand, and Tunisia.

History 
In mid-1968, Christian Guignard opened his first grill restaurant near the Champs-Élysées in Paris. The  restaurant served prime rib on a thick wooden board with matchstick fries.  Changes such as vegetarian dishes, Braille menus, and sides of green beans were later added.

In February 1992, Group Flo led by Jean-Paul Bucher bought the assets of Hippopotamus.

References

External links 
 Official site

Restaurants in France
Theme restaurants